Arnav (born as Amjath Khan) is a Tamil television actor. He made his debut in serials with Sakthi. He is known for his anti-hero role as Arya in that serial. He later acted in the serial Keladi Kanmani in which his role as Yugendran, a caring husband, was well received.

Television

Serials

Web series

Awards and honours

References

External links

Living people
1989 births
Tamil male television actors
People from Tamil Nadu
Madras Christian College alumni
Indian Institute of Planning and Management alumni